German submarine U-360 was a Type VIIC U-boat of Nazi Germany's Kriegsmarine during World War II.

She carried out five patrols before being sunk in the Norwegian Sea by a British warship on 2 April 1944.

She was a member of five wolfpacks.

She damaged one ship and one warship.

Design
German Type VIIC submarines were preceded by the shorter Type VIIB submarines. U-360 had a displacement of  when at the surface and  while submerged. She had two shafts and two  propellers.

U-360 was fitted with five  torpedo tubes (four fitted at the bow and one at the stern), fourteen torpedoes, one  SK C/35 naval gun, 220 rounds, and two twin  C/30 anti-aircraft guns. The boat had a complement of between forty-four and sixty.

Service history
The submarine was laid down on 9 August 1941 at the Flensburger Schiffbau-Gesellschaft yard at Flensburg as yard number 479, launched on 28 July 1942 and commissioned on 12 November under the command of Oberleutnant zur See Hans-Jügen Bühring.

She served with the 5th U-boat Flotilla from 12 November 1942 and the 13th flotilla from 1 July 1943.

First patrol
The boat's first patrol was preceded by trips from Kiel in Germany to Bergen and then Narvik in Norway, from where she departed on 16 August 1943. She sailed southwest of Svalbard and west of Bear Island. She docked in Hammerfest on 24 September.

Second and third patrols
Her second foray was a repeat of her first – finishing in Narvik on 19 November 1943.

The submarine's third patrol took her around Bear Island.

Fourth patrol
She also damaged the Fort Bellingham the next day.

Fifth patrol and loss
Having moved from Hammerfest to Trondheim, U-360 started her fifth patrol on 29 March 1944. On 2 April, she was sunk southwest of Bear Island by depth charges from the British destroyer .

51 men died in the U-boat; there were no survivors.

Wolfpacks
U-360 took part in five wolfpacks, namely:
 Monsun (8 – 21 October 1943) 
 Eisenbart (22 October – 17 November 1943) 
 Eisenbart (25 – 28 November 1943) 
 Isegrim (1 – 27 January 1944) 
 Blitz (30 March – 2 April 1944)

Summary of raiding history

References

Notes

Citations

Bibliography

External links

German Type VIIC submarines
U-boats commissioned in 1942
U-boats sunk in 1944
U-boats sunk by British warships
U-boats sunk by depth charges
1942 ships
Ships built in Flensburg
Ships lost with all hands
World War II submarines of Germany
World War II shipwrecks in the Norwegian Sea
Maritime incidents in April 1944